Gabriel Ramanantsoa (13 April 1906 Antananarivo – 9 May 1979 Paris) was the President and Prime Minister of Madagascar from 1972 to 1975.

Ramanantsoa was a member of the Merina ethnic group, and came from a wealthy family. He graduated from Saint-Cyr in 1931. He was a career officer in the French army. After Madagascar became independent, he joined the Madagascar military, rising to the rank of Major General. In May 1972, amidst massive political protests, he became prime minister of the country with tacit French backing, and President Philibert Tsiranana vested him with full executive powers. Tsiranana resigned altogether on October 11, 1972 following a referendum that approved a five-year transition period under military leadership, and Ramanantsoa became president as well. He tried to start political reconciliation. His popularity faded due to rumors of corruption involving him and his wife, and government was nearly overthrown in December 1974 by an anti-Merina coup led by Bréchard Rajaonarison. He lost the backing of Richard Ratsimandrava and Didier Ratsiraka and on February 5, 1975 he was forced to resign amidst ethnic and social class tensions.

His nephew, Bernard Ramanantsoa, served as dean of the French business school HEC Paris from 1996 to 2015.

References

1906 births
1978 deaths
Presidents of Madagascar
People from Antananarivo
Merina people
Prime Ministers of Madagascar
Academic staff of HEC Paris